Erik Hagen (born 30 July 1941) was a Norwegian football defender.

He played for Frigg between 1961 and 1968, finishing 4th in the league on four occasions, and being a runner-up in the 1965 Norwegian Football Cup. He represented Norway as an U21, B and senior international.

References

1941 births
Living people
Norwegian footballers
Frigg Oslo FK players
Norway under-21 international footballers
Norway international footballers
Association football defenders